El Cantar de mi ciudad (English language: The Singer of My City) is a 1930 Argentine film directed and written by José A. Ferreyra. The film has historical significance as it was the first ever sound film produced in Argentina. The film was released on 3 October 1930.

Cast
Antonio Ber Ciani as  Hermenegildo
Esther Calvo as La Loba
Alvaro Escobar as Garufa
Felipe Farah
Arturo Forte as Maldonado
Lina Montiel as Marimoña
María Turgenova as La muchacha del tango
Mario Zappa .... Jilguero

References

External links
 

1930 films
1930s Spanish-language films
Argentine black-and-white films
Films directed by José A. Ferreyra
1930s Argentine films